Antonio Dorini is an Italian bobsledder who competed in the late 1920s and early 1930s. He won a gold medal in the four-man event at the first FIBT World Championships in Montreux, Switzerland at the Caux-sur-Montreux hotel in 1930.

References
Bobsleigh four-man world championship medalists since 1930

Italian male bobsledders
Possibly living people
Year of birth missing